Compania de Transport Public Cluj-Napoca ("Cluj-Napoca Public Transport Company", CTP; until 2013 RATUC, Regia Autonomă de Transport Urban de Călători) is the local public transport company of Cluj-Napoca, Romania. The company runs an extensive  public transport network within the city using trams, trolleybuses and buses.

Trams
The local public transport company, CTP, manages a  tram line (opened in 1987) that runs through the city. The 2010s modernisation involved the installation of new rail tracks, and acquisition of 4 Pesa Swing trams. This brought a number of advantages, including vibration and shock reduction, a substantial noise decrease, long use expectancy and higher transit speed – -. In the Mănăştur area, under the bridge, the track route was modified, now crossing roundabouts in the middle rather than following the direction of the traffic lanes. Given the development of the metropolitan area, further plans feature the creation of a light rail track between Gilău and Jucu that will use these modernised tracks in the city. In 2018, a new contract was signed with Astra Vagoane Călători for the supply of 24 Astra Imperio trams, which were delivered in 2020-2021.

Rolling stock

Current vehicles

See also
 Cluj-Napoca Metro

References

External links

 Official site

Regia Autonoma de Transport Urban Calatori
Cluj-Napoca
Cluj-Napoca
Cluj-Napoca